Tarucus nara, the striped Pierrot, is a small butterfly found in Sri Lanka and south India that belongs to the lycaenids or blues family.

Gallery

See also
List of butterflies of India
List of butterflies of India (Lycaenidae)

References

Tarucus
Butterflies of Asia
Butterflies described in 1848